A Perfect Enemy is a 2020 psychological thriller directed by Kike Maíllo based on Amélie Nothomb's novel The Enemy's Cosmetique. The film is a Spanish-German-French international co-production starring Tomasz Kot and Athena Strates alongside Marta Nieto and Dominique Pinon.

Plot 
The plot tracks the pyschological nightmare that ensues after the casual meeting between an architect and a chatty woman in an airport.

Cast

Production 
The film is a Spanish-German-French co-production by Sábado Películas, Barry Films, The Project, and Hessen-Invest Film.

Release 
The film was presented at the 53rd Sitges Film Festival on 16 October 2020. It was released on Filmin streaming on 29 January 2021, reportedly becoming the largest release on the platform up to that date.

Reception 
According to the review aggregation website Rotten Tomatoes, A Perfect Enemy has a 86% approval rating based on 14 reviews from critics, with an average rating of 6.0/10.

Phil Hoad of The Guardian rated the film 3 out of 5 stars, deeming it to be a "well-written, devious Euro-thriller".

Sergio F. Pinilla of Cinemanía rated the film 3 out of 5 stars, considering that the story "works", with the viewer feeling "trapped in the waiting room of that airport, at the mercy of the lurking and morbid tales of a stranger", summing up the film as a "psychothriller that relates perfection with (self-)destruction".

See also 
 List of Spanish films of 2021

References

External links 
 A Perfect Enemy at ICAA's Catálogo de Cinespañol

2020s English-language films
2020s Spanish films
2020s French films
2020s German films
2020 psychological thriller films
Spanish psychological thriller films
German psychological thriller films
French psychological thriller films
Films set in airports
Films based on Belgian novels